Planetary Duality is the second studio album by American death metal band The Faceless. It was released on November 11, 2008 through Sumerian Records (in Europe through Lifeforce Records). It is a concept album with the lyrics following a science fiction theme of an extraterrestrial and extra-dimensional race controlling the world and is loosely inspired by the book The Children of the Matrix by David Icke. The album debuted at number 119 on the Billboard 200, selling around 5,600 copies in its first week.

Track listing

Personnel 

The Faceless
 Derek Rydquist - lead vocals
 Michael Keene - all guitars, clean vocals, vocoder, keyboards

 Brandon Giffin - bass
 Lyle Cooper - drums

Artwork and design
 Artwork - Pär Olofsson
 Layout - Kilebong.com

Other
 Matthew Blackmar - keyboards

Appearances 
The fifth song "XenoChrist" is featured in Rock Band 3 as downloadable content via the Rock Band Network.

External links

References 

2008 albums
The Faceless albums
Sumerian Records albums
Albums with cover art by Pär Olofsson